Martin Liao Cheung-kong, JP (born 1957) is a non-official member of the Executive Council of Hong Kong and a member of Legislative Council of Hong Kong for Commercial (Second) constituency and a barrister.

Background
Liao received his honorary Bachelor of Science in Economics and Master of Laws from University College London. He was a member of the Copyright Tribunal from 2001 to 2005. Since 2008, Liao has been a member of the National People's Congress. Andrew Liao is his older brother.

In the 2012 Hong Kong legislative election, Liao secured the Commercial (Second) functional constituency, nominated by the Chinese General Chamber of Commerce, uncontested.

He retained his Legislative Council seat in the 2016 election, again without having to face an opponent. He became convenor of the pro-establishment caucus after Ip Kwok-him of the Democratic Alliance for the Betterment and Progress of Hong Kong (DAB) retired.

In November 2016, he was appointed by Chief Executive Leung Chun-ying to the Executive Council of Hong Kong.

In November 2020, following the expulsion of 4 pro-democracy lawmakers in the Legislative Council, Liao claimed that despite there being no opposition members in the Legislative Council, there would still somehow be opposing views within the legislature.

In January 2021, Liao partially blamed teachers on the 2019-20 Hong Kong protests and said that teachers could have "ulterior political motives" in classrooms which could "deeply impact students negatively."

In February 2021, after Xia Baolong said that only "patriots" could be part of the Hong Kong government and that electoral changes would be needed, Liao agreed and said that it was not up to those in Hong Kong to decide rules on electoral changes, and that "It must be a matter for the National People's Congress and the National People's Congress Standing Committee. Hong Kong has no say in any amendments to the Basic Law."

In March 2021, Liao supported changes to Hong Kong's election system and criticized democratic systems, claiming that the changes would make Hong Kong less prone to "dictatorship of the majority." In addition, Liao claimed that "Many people in Hong Kong are politically immature" and that one vote per person would not be suitable for Hong Kong.

In March 2021, Liao criticized RTHK, claiming that the station was biased against the government.

In February 2022, Liao told SCMP that he would not be attending the 2022 Two Sessions, as a Hong Kong delegate.

Honours
Liao was appointed a Justice of the Peace in 2004.

References

1957 births
Living people
Hong Kong Christians
HK LegCo Members 2012–2016
HK LegCo Members 2016–2021
HK LegCo Members 2022–2025
Barristers of Hong Kong
Alumni of University College London
Delegates to the 11th National People's Congress from Hong Kong
Delegates to the 12th National People's Congress from Hong Kong
Delegates to the 13th National People's Congress from Hong Kong
Hong Kong people of Hakka descent
Members of the Executive Council of Hong Kong
People from Wuhua